The joule-second (symbol J⋅s or J s) is the unit of action and of angular momentum in the International System of Units (SI) equal to the product of an SI derived unit, the joule (J), and an SI base unit, the second (s). The joule-second is a unit of action or of angular momentum. The joule-second also appears in quantum mechanics within the definition of Planck's constant. Angular momentum is the product of an object’s moment of inertia, in units of kg⋅m2 and its angular velocity in units of rad⋅s−1. This product of moment of inertia and angular velocity yields kg⋅m2⋅s−1 or the joule-second. Planck's constant represents the energy of a wave, in units of joule, divided by the frequency of that wave, in units of s−1. This quotient of energy and frequency also yields the joule-second (J⋅s).

Base units
In SI base units the joule-second becomes kilogram-meter squared-per second or kg⋅m2⋅s−1. Dimensional Analysis of the joule-second yields M L2 T−1. Note the denominator of seconds (s) in the base units.

Confusion with joules per second
The joule-second should not be confused with the joule per second (J/s). 

joule per second: In physical processes, when the unit of time appears in the denominator of a ratio, the described process occurs at a rate. For example, in discussions about speed, an object like a car travels a known distance of kilometers spread over a known number of seconds, and the car's speed is measured in the unit kilometer per second (km/s). In physics, work per time describes a system's power, with the unit watt (W), which is equal to joule per second (J/s).

joule-second: To understand joule-second (J⋅s) we can imagine the operator of an energy storage facility quoting a price for storing energy that is separately proportional to each of the amount stored and the duration of storage. Storing 10,000 joules for 400 seconds would cost a certain amount. Storing double the energy for half the time would use the same resources, and cost the same.

See also
 Orders of magnitude (angular momentum)
 Action (physics)

References

SI derived units